Victor Gold may refer to:

Victor Gold (chemist) (1922–1985), British chemist
Victor Gold (journalist) (1928–2017), American journalist, author and Republican political consultant
Victor J. Gold, dean of Loyola Law School

See also
 Gold (surname)